Granary Music is the independent record label and publishing company operated by Alternative/punk/indie icon Bob Mould, formerly of Hüsker Dü and Sugar.

As a record label, its only artists are Mould himself, his former band Sugar, and his electronic dance music side project Loudbomb.  Under the Granary name, Mould controls the master rights to the entire Sugar discography, and all of the solo work he has recorded since Sugar's breakup in 1995.  Most of these masters have been leased through Granary to other labels, including Rykodisc and Yep Roc; however, Mould released his 2002 solo album Modulate and the Loudbomb CD directly through Granary.

Granary also controls the publishing rights to all of Mould's compositions, including all of the songs he wrote and performed with Hüsker Dü, which he claimed after the band's own publishing partnership was disbanded in 1988.

Granary is also the name used to refer to Mould's home studio, first used in NYC for parts of The Last Dog and Pony Show and for Modulate. When he moved to Washington, D.C., Mould moved the studio and label along with him and recorded most of the basics (save for live drums) for his 2005 Body of Song there.

In a June 2005 interview Mould expressed interest in reissuing Hüsker Dü's SST releases on Granary, but the other former Hüskers, Grant Hart and Greg Norton, have so far been reluctant to sign off and allow Mould to take control of the SST Hüsker tapes on behalf of the band.

See also
 List of record labels

American independent record labels
Vanity record labels
Alternative rock record labels